The 2014 Baltic Cup was a football competition, held between 29 and 31 May 2014, hosted by Latvia.

Format
For the second time in a row Finland joined Estonia, Latvia and Lithuania, thus the knock-out tournament format established in the previous edition was maintained. Penalty shoot-outs were used to decide the winner if a match was drawn after 90 minutes.

Results

Matches

Semi-finals

Note: This was the farewell match for Latvia's forward Māris Verpakovskis.

Third place match

Final

Winners

Statistics

Goalscorers

See also
Balkan Cup
Nordic Football Championship

References

External links
 Tournament site on Latvian Football Federation

Baltic Cup (football)
Baltic Cup
Baltic Cup
Baltic Cup
Baltic Cup
International association football competitions hosted by Latvia